Niaogho is a town in the Niaogho Department of Boulgou Province in southeastern Burkina Faso. In 2005, its population was 13,545.

References

Populated places in the Centre-Est Region
Boulgou Province